The Ilseder Hütte is a former ironworks in Ilsede (district of Peine) in Lower Saxony, Germany

History 
Funded by the bank Ephraim Meyer & Sohn Carl Hostmann founded an Ironworks based on supposed both coal- and orefields in this area. Though there were then found no sufficient coal fields, the company, named "Bergbau und Hüttengesellschaft zu Peine" was established in 1853. This company ended in insolvency during an economical crisis in 1858.

Under Fritz Hurtzig and Carl Haarmann on September  6, 1858 the "Aktiengesellschaft Ilseder Hütte" was taking over the assets, and in 1861 the production started. Despite the site's unfavorable geographical situation, the factory prospered and rapidly expanded its business.

In the era of the German Empire, the company became a major player in Germany's coal and steel industry. In 1872 a rolling mill was added and in 1879 a third blast furnace started work.

In 1928 the Ilseder Hütte took a 10 billion US-$ loan from the National City Bank of New York.

In 1929 the opening of the Mittelland Canal reduced the transport's costs.

World War II caused no damage and the company expanded up to 1970s economic crisis.

Mergers 
In 1970 the company merged with the state-owned Salzgitter AG. The ore mining ended in 1978 and in 1983 the last blast furnace was shut down.

In 1989 the company became part of Preussag Preussag stopped in 1995 the remaining productive parts such as coking plant, power plant and by-products.

The area became an industrial park. The blowing engine building is in use for various events whereas the steam production building was torn down in spring 2010.

See also 
 Zollverein Coal Mine Industrial Complex
 Dillinger Hütte

Literature

Notes

References

External links 

 
 
 This article is a translation from the German Wikipedia. The version used can be found under the following link:  , The original authors of the German-language version can be found here . German-language version can be found here .

Steel companies of Germany
Companies established in 1858
Companies disestablished in 1970